Hext may refer to:

Places 
 Hext, Oklahoma
 Hext, Texas

Other uses 
 Hext (surname)